Gravity is the debut studio album by American record producer and musician Gryffin. It was released through Darkroom and Geffen Records on October 24, 2019, succeeding its prelude Gravity, Pt. 1.

Background
Gryffin told LA Weekly: "This album's a big milestone for me. I first came up remixing music, now I'm focusing on all my original music. This album is the first bloody work I'm putting out there and it's gonna live forever."

The album was originally slated to be the second part to Gravity, Pt. 1 and be released on October 10.

Promotion

Singles
The song "Nobody Compares to You", featuring Katie Pearlman, was released in October 2017, followed by "Just for a Moment", featuring Iselin Solheim, released in June 2018. In August 2018, Gryffin was rebranded and, to mark the occasion, released "Tie Me Down", in collaboration with Elley Duhe, weeks apart from her collaboration with Zedd. "Remember", with Zohara, was released in October 2018, which was shortly followed by the announcement of an upcoming project. Two promotional singles were released, entitled "Bye Bye", featuring Ivy Adara, and "You Remind Me", featuring Stanaj, before the release of his debut extended play Gravity, Pt. 1.

In 2019, "All You Need to Know", in collaboration with Slander and featuring Calle Lehmann, was released in March 2019. "Hurt People", in collaboration with Aloe Blacc, was shortly followed in May 2019. Gryffin announced the release of the song "OMG", in collaboration with Carly Rae Jepsen, in July 2019, captioning the post "Big one coming this week".

In September 2019, Gryffin announced the full-length album was to be released on October 10, 2019, and released the song "Baggage", in collaboration with Gorgon City and AlunaGeorge. Following its release, Billboard previewed the record, saying: "If the early tracks are any indication, the LP will be jam-packed with massive collabs showing off the producer's wide-ranging sonic palette and full songwriting scope."

In October 2019, Gryffin announced the last single from the album to be released, entitled "Body Back", featuring vocals from Maia Wright, a week prior to album release on October 18, 2019.

Tour
In 2019, the album was supported by the Gravity Tour which was set up in two parts. The first began in Philadelphia on January 25, 2019, concluding in Pomona, California on February 26, 2019. Additionally, it featured special guests Shallou, SNBRN, Yung Bae and Devault.

The second part, officially titled Gravity II Tour, began in Los Angeles on October 11, 2019, and concluded in San Diego on December 7, 2019. Like its previous leg, it will also feature special guests, which were announced in August as Jonas Blue, Medasin, The Knocks, Bunt and Fairlane.

Track listing

Notes
  signifies a co-producer
  signifies an additional producer
  signifies a vocal producer

Charts

Weekly charts

Year-end charts

References

2019 albums
Interscope Records albums
Albums produced by TMS (production team)
Albums produced by Mac & Phil
Albums produced by Mark Ralph (record producer)